The Caledonia Bridge, also known as Goose River Bridge, over the Goose River near Caledonia, North Dakota, was built in 
1895.  It was designed/built by the Wrought Iron Bridge Co. and is a Pratt through truss bridge.  It was listed on the National Register of Historic Places in 1997.

References

External links

Road bridges on the National Register of Historic Places in North Dakota
Bridges completed in 1895
Transportation in Traill County, North Dakota
National Register of Historic Places in Traill County, North Dakota
Wrought iron bridges in the United States
1895 establishments in North Dakota
Bridges over the Goose River (North Dakota)